The 2023 Vuelta a Andalucía Ruta del Sol (English: Tour of Andalucia Route of the Sun) was a road cycling stage race that took place between 15 and 19 February 2023 in the autonomous community of Andalusia in southern Spain. The race was rated as a category 2.Pro event on the 2023 UCI ProSeries calendar, and was the 69th edition of the Vuelta a Andalucía.

Teams 
10 of the 18 UCI WorldTeams and eight UCI ProTeams made up the 18 teams that participated in the race.

UCI WorldTeams

 
 
 
 
 
 
 
 
 

UCI ProTeams

Route

Stages

Stage 1 
15 February 2023 – Puente de Génave to Santiago de la Espada,

Stage 2 
16 February 2023 – Diezma to Alcalá la Real,

Stage 3 
17 February 2023 – Alcalá de Guadaíra to Alcalá de los Gazules,

Stage 4 
18 February 2023 – Olvera to Iznájar,

Stage 5 
19 February 2023 – Villa de Otura to Alhaurín de la Torre,

Classification leadership table

Final classification standings

General classification

Points classification

Mountains classification

Sprints classification

Team classification

References

Sources

External links 
 

2023
Vuelta a Andalucía
Vuelta a Andalucía
Vuelta a Andalucía
2020s in Andalusia